Gerald Patterson and Suzanne Lenglen were the defending champions, but Patterson did not participate. Lenglen partnered with André Gobert but they lost in the second round to eventual champions Randolph Lycett and Elizabeth Ryan.

Lycett and Ryan defeated Max Woosnam and Phyllis Howkins in the final, 6–3, 6–1 to win the mixed doubles tennis title at the 1921 Wimbledon Championships.

Draw

Finals

Top half

Section 1

The nationality of Mrs EP Hicks is unknown.

Section 2

The nationalities of Miss HA Lane and Mrs FW Orr are unknown.

Bottom half

Section 3

Section 4

The nationalities of C Goodall and Mrs D Harvey are unknown.

References

External links

X=Mixed Doubles
Wimbledon Championship by year – Mixed doubles